Ou Char is a khum (commune) of Battambang District in Battambang Province in north-western Cambodia.

Villages

 Ou Char
 Prey Koun Sek
 Kab Kou Thmei
 Andoung Chenh
 Anhchanh
 Ang

References

Communes of Battambang province
Battambang District